Pondicherry Football Association is the state governing body of football in Puducherry. It is affiliated with the All India Football Federation, the national governing body.

Competitions
 Pondicherry Men's League
 Pondicherry Women's League

References

Football in Puducherry
Football governing bodies in India